Lewis Vincent Benfatti (born March 9, 1971) is a former professional American football player. The 6' 4", 278 lb., defensive tackle was the third round pick (#94 overall) of the New York Jets in the 1994 NFL Draft. He played three seasons (1994–1996) with the Jets. Benfatti was named All-America and a Lombardi Award finalist while at Penn State University. A team captain for the Nittany Lions, he played in the 1994 East-West Shrine Game and Senior Bowl games.

He earned a Bachelor of Arts in speech communication from Penn State in 1993. Benfatti was an All-State football player and heavyweight wrestler at Morris Knolls High School in Denville, New Jersey.

Benfatti is the principal of Hopatcong High School, in Hopatcong, New Jersey.

References

1971 births
Living people
American football defensive tackles
New York Jets players
Penn State Nittany Lions football players
People from Rockaway Township, New Jersey